During the 1999–2000 English football season, Hartlepool United Football Club competed in the Football League Third Division where they finished in 7th position on 72 points and qualified for the play-offs but lost to local rivals Darlington in the semi-final.

Players

Current squad

Results

Division Three

Results summary

Results by matchday

Football League Division Three play-offs

League Cup

FA Cup

Football League Trophy

Squad
Appearances for competitive matches only

References

Hartlepool United 1999–2000 at soccerbase.com (use drop down list to select relevant season)

See also
1999–2000 in English football

Hartlepool United F.C. seasons
Hartlepool United
1990s in County Durham